Agneau de pré-salé (French: "Salt marsh lamb") is a type of lamb which was raised in salt marsh meadows of France, (especially Mont Saint-Michel in Normandy and the Bay of the Somme in Picardy) and parts of the UK and the Netherlands. The sheep graze in pastures that are covered in halophyte grasses with a high salinity and iodine content, causing their meat to have a distinct taste that is considered a delicacy.

In 2006, salt marsh lamb raised in the area around the Bay of the Somme was registered as an Appellation d'origine contrôlée (AOC), followed by registration as an EU Protected Designation of Origin (PDO, French: Appellation d'origine protégée, AOP) in 2013 under the name Prés-salés de la baie de Somme. In the same year also salt march lamb raised near Mont-Saint-Michel was registered as PDO under the name: Prés-salés du Mont-Saint-Michel. 

Salt marsh lambs can also be found, to a lesser extent, in the United Kingdom and the Netherlands. The Gower Salt Marsh Lamb was protected under UK law as a PDO in 2021.

See also 
 French cuisine

References

Sheep
French cuisine
Picardy cuisine